Nambo may be,

Nambo language
Nambo railway station
Nambo Paradise Botanical Garden